District Six is a place in Cape Town, South Africa.

District Six may also refer to:

Government divisions
 District 6, Ho Chi Minh City, Vietnam
 District 6 (New York City Council), in the United States
 VI District, Turku, in Finland
 District 6 (Zürich), in Switzerland
 District 6 (Düsseldorf), a district of Düsseldorf, Germany
 District 6, an electoral district of Malta
 Districts 6 and 6A, police districts of Malta

Schools
 District 6 Schoolhouse, a historic school in East Providence, Rhode Island, United States
 Little Red Schoolhouse (Brunswick, New York), also known as District 6 Schoolhouse, in Brunswick, New York, United States

Other uses
 District Six (album), an album by Amphibious Assault
 District 6 (Hunger Games), fictional district in the Hunger Games books and films

See also
Sector 6 (Bucharest)
District 5 (disambiguation)
District 7 (disambiguation)
District 9, a 2009 film with elements inspired by events that occurred in District Six, Cape Town.